Ernst Wilhelm Leberecht Tempel (4 December 1821 – 16 March 1889), normally known as Wilhelm Tempel, was a German astronomer who worked in Marseille until the outbreak of the Franco-Prussian War in 1870, then later moved to Italy.

Tempel was born at Niedercunnersdorf, Saxony. He was a prolific discoverer of comets, discovering or co-discovering 21 in all, including Comet 55P/Tempel-Tuttle, now known to be the parent body of the Leonid meteor shower, and 9P/Tempel, the target of the NASA probe Deep Impact in 2005. Other periodic comets that bear his name include 10P/Tempel and 11P/Tempel-Swift-LINEAR.

In 1861, he was awarded the Lalande Prize. He won the Prix Valz for the year 1880. The main-belt asteroid 3808 Tempel and the lunar crater Tempel are named after him.

References

External links 
 
 
 W. Tempel @ Astrophysics Data System

1821 births
1889 deaths
Discoverers of asteroids
Discoverers of comets

19th-century German astronomers
People from Görlitz (district)
Recipients of the Lalande Prize
Scientists from Saxony